Samuel Miles Hopkins (May 9, 1772March 9, 1837) was a United States Representative from New York. Born in Salem, Connecticut, he graduated from Yale College in 1791, studied law, was admitted to the bar and commenced practice in Le Roy, Genesee County, New York in 1793. He moved to New York City in 1794 and continued the practice of law.

Hopkins was elected as a Federalist to the Thirteenth Congress, holding office from March 4, 1813, to March 3, 1815. He was a member of the New York State Assembly (Genesee Co.) in 1820-21; and of the New York State Senate (Western D.) in 1822. From 1813 to 1826, he was Reporter of the New York Court of Chancery. He was a member of the commission to superintend the construction of Sing Sing Prison from 1825 to 1830 and was a judge of the State circuit court 1832 to 1836. Hopkins died in Geneva, Ontario County in 1837; interment was in Washington Street Cemetery.

References

External links 
 

1772 births
1837 deaths
People from Salem, Connecticut
People of colonial Connecticut
Federalist Party members of the United States House of Representatives from New York (state)
Members of the New York State Assembly
New York (state) state senators
New York (state) state court judges
Sing Sing
Yale College alumni
Burials in New York (state)